M'Hamed Merouani (born March 29, 1997) is an Algerian footballer who plays for MC Alger in the Algerian Ligue Professionnelle 1.

References

External links
 

1997 births
Living people
Algerian footballers
Association football defenders
People from Chlef
ASO Chlef players
MC Alger players
Algerian Ligue Professionnelle 1 players
Algeria under-23 international footballers
21st-century Algerian people